Dashiell Raymond Mihok (born May 24, 1974) is an American actor and director best known for playing Brendan "Bunchy" Donovan in the Showtime drama Ray Donovan.

Early life
Mihok was born in New York City, the son of theater actors Andrea Mihok (née Cloak) and Raymond Thorne (né Mihok). He has two older sisters: Gwen Mihok, an actress, and Cecily Trenka, a science teacher. He is of Czech and British descent.

Mihok grew up in Greenwich Village and lived in the artist community Westbeth on Bank Street. Mihok went to PS 3, a public elementary school in Manhattan, currently named the John Melser Charrette School. He attended the Center School (MS 243) for middle school. While attending Bronx High School of Science, where he played baseball as a middle infielder, Mihok joined CityKids Repertory, and appeared in the short-lived TV show, CityKids, which featured local New York child actors and Jim Henson's The Muppets. Mihok also attended the Professional Children's School in Manhattan with best friend, actor Donald Faison.

Career

Acting 
Mihok got his start doing guest spots in local New York City productions of Law & Order, NYPD Blue, and New York Undercover. In 1994, Mihok debuted in the independent film, Black is White. In 1995, Mihok appeared in the CBS movie of the week, Murderous Intent.

In 1996, Mihok appeared in director Barry Levinson's film Sleepers, which was notable for its depiction of sexual abuse. Mihok said he did a lot of research for that role. He was also in the Angelina Jolie film, Foxfire. In 1996, the Leonardo DiCaprio and Claire Danes-starring Romeo + Juliet was Mihok's breakout role. To prepare for his audition, Mihok studied Shakespeare and had five extensive audition sessions with director Baz Luhrmann before landing the role of Benvolio. The film shot on location in Mexico, and Mihok said he considers the experience life-changing.

In 1998, for Terrence Malick's Thin Red Line, Mihok said he spent an intensive six months working on the film, with the amount of footage constituting a full starring part, but during editing was reduced to an ensemble role as Private First Class Doll.

In 1996, Mihok was a featured regular in the role of Joey in the Rhea Perlman CBS sitcom Pearl. In 1999, he appeared on The WB series Felicity, where he portrayed Lynn, a competitive swimmer, in multiple episodes. He has been featured in roles in films such as The Day After Tomorrow, The Perfect Storm, I Am Legend, and Silver Linings Playbook. He has had starring roles in independent features such as Telling You and Loveless in Los Angeles.

In 2006, Mihok appeared in the film Hollywoodland and in 2007 in the film, Firehouse Dog. In 2008, he played Detective Martin Soap in the film Punisher: War Zone. In 2011, Mihok directed a short film called Abby. The film stars his sister, Gwen. He also directed the 2006 short film called That Guy.

As part of the 2011 straight-to-video film, Lifted, Mihok and the actor who plays his son in the film, Uriah Shelton, recorded a song called "I Miss You." The film features many musical and dance performances by Mihok. In 2013, Mihok portrayed the character "Gage" in Payday 2 web series.

Since 2013, Mihok has co-starred as Brendan "Bunchy" Donovan in the Showtime drama Ray Donovan. Bunchy had been sexually abused by a priest as a child and is an alcoholic and has sexual anorexia. For the show the cast works out at the Santa Monica, California boxing gym Wild Card West with boxer Rob Garcia. Mihok was slated to direct an episode in 2017, as he said he has been directing pilots to prepare. He directed the season 7 episode "An Irish Lullaby" which aired December 15, 2019.

In 2014, he portrayed Whelan, in the horror-thriller film, Before I Wake, co-starring in the Mike Flanagan-directed film Annabeth Gish, Thomas Jane and Kate Bosworth.

In 2016, Mihok appeared in the film, So B. It, which stars Alfre Woodard, Cloris Leachman, Jacinda Barrett, and John Heard. In 2017, Mihok appeared in the independent film, The Girl Who Invented Kissing, as Victor, a man who becomes mentally disabled after being in a car accident. He stars opposite Suki Waterhouse and Vincent Piazza, who plays his younger brother. In 2017, Mihok played a car salesman in the film Car Dogs, which features Patrick J. Adams, Octavia Spencer, Josh Hopkins, among others. In 2022, he played David, an intellectually disabled man, in Wildflower.

Music
When he was 12 years old, Mihok started a band with his friends called S.D.C. (Sam, Dash, Chris aka Strictly Devastating Crew).

In 2004, Mihok appeared on Sicilian-Puerto Rican New York-based rapper Sabac Red's record Sabacolypse: A Change Gon' Come, on the track "I Have A Dream." The lyrics refer to tics that people exhibit as symptoms of Tourette syndrome. For the 2005 movie Green Street Hooligans, Mihok wrote the title track "Test of a Man." During this time he also collaborated with Daniel Freedman, a jazz drummer, percussionist, and composer on various music projects.

Since 2015, Mihok has been in the band Diz and the Fam. Members of Diz and the Fam are Mike Choi, Kenny Echizen, Justin Frazier, Sharlotte Gibson, Morris Hayes, Joel Hellman, Brett Nolan, and Elliot Yamin. The band has released three singles. The 2015 video for Love (feat. Jeff Taylor) features many actors from Ray Donovan.

Other work
Mihok studied dance. He can be seen dancing opposite then-girlfriend Alanis Morissette in her music video "So Pure". Mihok is also a photographer. His photography of Morissette is used on the back cover of her "Thank U" single and is credited for Supposed Former Infatuation Junkie.

Personal life 

Mihok was named after writer Dashiell Hammett, the author of The Thin Man, The Glass Key and The Maltese Falcon. His Czech surname is pronounced "my"-Hawk.

Mihok was diagnosed with Tourette syndrome at age six, and is a spokesperson and is on the board for the nonprofit Jaylen's Challenge, founded by the then 9-year old, Jaylen Arnold. He is an active supporter of the Tourette Syndrome Association. Mihok's two older sisters both have Tourette's; it is often genetic.

Mihok once stated that an early reason he became an actor was because he had so much experience in hiding his Tourette's. He said the focus required of acting allows him to mask many of his tics. Mihok says the biggest misconception about Tourette's Syndrome is about vocal tics, called coprolalia. Not everyone with Tourette's does that: "Tics tend to wax and wane, not everybody's screaming obscenities all the time." Mihok said he took medication during high school for the Tourette's. In 1997, Mihok met Alanis Morissette through mutual friend Leonardo DiCaprio during a trip to Cuba. The lyrics to the songs "So Pure" from Supposed Former Infatuation Junkie and "That Particular Time" from Under Rug Swept are about him.

In 2009, Mihok married singer Valeria Mason. They have two children and live in Los Angeles. Mihok has said that he is a Roman Catholic.

Awards 
 1999: Satellite Awards, Special Achievement Award, Outstanding Motion Picture Ensemble for The Thin Red Line
 2014: Tourette Association of America, Shining Star Award
 2017: Beverly Hills Film Festival, Best Actor for The Girl Who Invented Kissing

Filmography

Film

Television

Music videos

Theater 
 1985: Romeo and Juliet by Sergei Prokofiev, American Ballet Theatre, Metropolitan Opera
 1987: Carrying School Children by Thomas Babe, Theater for the New City

Miscellaneous

Discography 
 2004: Sabacolypse: A Change Gon' Come by Sabac Red – track called "I Have A Dream" ft. Dash Mihok & Cenophia Mitchell
 2005: "Test of a Man" by Dash Mihok – from the film Green Street Hooligans
 2009: "I Miss You" by Uriah Shelton and Dash Mihok – from the film Lifted
 2009: "Sunshine (Ft. Dash Mihok)" sung by Uriah Shelton featuring Dash Mihok – from the film Lifted
 2015: "Stolen Hearts" by Dash Mihok – from Payday 2
 DIZ and The Fam
 2015: Love (feat. Jeff Taylor) – Single (DIZ Music Inc)
 2015: The Evil That Men Do – Single (Diz and The Fam) – featured on Ray Donovan
 2016: Be Better – Single (DZE Music)

References

External links 

 
 
 Diz and the Fam

1974 births
20th-century American male actors
21st-century American male actors
American male film actors
American male television actors
American people of British descent
American people of Czech descent
Living people
Male actors from New York City
People with Tourette syndrome
The Bronx High School of Science alumni
Catholics from New York (state)